The Mating Game may refer to:

The Mating Game (album), an album and its title track by Bitter:Sweet
The Mating Game (film), a 1959 film starring Debbie Reynolds and Tony Randall
"The Mating Game" (D:TNG episode), an episode of U.S. TV series Degrassi: The Next Generation